

Films

LGBT
1972 in LGBT history
1972
1972